Henry Waggaman Edwards (October 1779July 22, 1847) was an American lawyer, a Democrat, and the 27th and 29th governor of the U.S. state of Connecticut (1833–1834, 1835–1838). He previously served in both the U.S. Senate (1823 to 1827) and the U.S. House of Representatives (1819 to 1823).

Biography
Edwards was born in New Haven, Connecticut, the son of Judge Pierpont Edwards and Frances Ogden. He graduated from Princeton University in 1797, and earned a law degree from the Litchfield Law School. He married Lydia Miller on October 4, 1801,  and they had seven children.

Career
Edwards became a lawyer, was active in Democratic politics, and was the United States representative from Connecticut at-large from 1819 to 1823. He was appointed to fill the vacancy caused by the death of Elijah Boardman as a United States Senator and served from Connecticut from 1823 to 1827.  He served as a member of Connecticut Senate at-large from 1828 to 1829. member of Connecticut state house of representatives from New Haven, in 1830, and the Speaker of the Connecticut House of Representatives in 1830. He was elected Lieutenant Governor of Connecticut in 1832, but was deprived of the office by a divided Assembly.

Elected in 1833, Edwards served as Governor of Connecticut from May 1, 1833 to May 7, 1834. Unsuccessful in his bid for the office in 1834, he was returned to office in 1835 and re-elected two more times, serving again from May 6, 1835 to May 2, 1838. During his tenure, a discriminatory education law was enacted, the railroad expanded, and the state funded a geological survey in 1835. When he did not win the Democratic party's nomination in 1838, he retired from public service.

Death
Edwards died in New Haven, Connecticut, and is interred at Grove Street Cemetery, New Haven, New Haven County, Connecticut.

References

External links

The Political Graveyard
National Governors Association
Litchfield Historical Society

1779 births
1847 deaths
People from New Haven, Connecticut
American people of English descent
Democratic-Republican Party members of the United States House of Representatives from Connecticut
Democratic-Republican Party United States senators from Connecticut
Jacksonian United States senators from Connecticut
Connecticut Jacksonians
Democratic Party governors of Connecticut
Jacksonian state governors of the United States
Speakers of the Connecticut House of Representatives
Democratic Party members of the Connecticut House of Representatives
Democratic Party Connecticut state senators
Burials at Grove Street Cemetery